Siroe is a dramma per musica or opera seria in 3 Acts by composer Pasquale Errichelli. The opera uses an Italian language libretto by Pietro Metastasio. The opera premiered at the Teatro di San Carlo in Naples on 26 December 1758. Vincenzo Re designed the sets for the premiere production.

Roles

References

1758 operas
Italian-language operas
Operas
Operas by Pasquale Errichelli
Opera world premieres at the Teatro San Carlo